Aleksey Petrovich Gushchin (5 January 1922 – 14 December 1986) was a Soviet pistol shooter who won the 50 m event at the 1960 Summer Olympics, setting a new Olympic record. During his career he set two world and two European records and won two individual silver medals at the world and European championships. In retirement he worked as a shooting coach and in 1965 wrote a handbook on pistol shooting.

References

External links

1922 births
1986 deaths
Communist Party of the Soviet Union members
Honoured Masters of Sport of the USSR
Recipients of the Order of the Red Banner of Labour
Russian male sport shooters
Soviet male sport shooters
Shooters at the 1960 Summer Olympics
Olympic shooters of the Soviet Union
Olympic gold medalists for the Soviet Union
Olympic medalists in shooting
Medalists at the 1960 Summer Olympics